Piovera (aka La Piovera) is an administrative neighborhood of Madrid belonging to the district of Hortaleza.

Featuring a residential area consisting of single detached dwellings, the neighborhood is inhabited by affluent people, and it hosts several embassies.

References 

Wards of Madrid
Hortaleza